Theodora "Dora" Kyriakou (Greek: Θεοδώρα "Δώρα" Κυριάκου; born 3 July 1967) is a retired Cypriot sprinter who competed primarily in the 200 and 400 metres. She represented her country at the 1996 Summer Olympics as well as three consecutive World Championships starting in 1993. In addition, she won the silver medal in the 400 metres at the 1997 Mediterranean Games setting a new national record of 52.02 seconds.

Competition record

Personal bests
Outdoor
200 metres – 23.52 (Pátra 1995)
400 metres – 52.02 (Bari 1997)
Indoor
400 metres – 53.14 (Pireás 1995)

References

1967 births
Living people
Cypriot female sprinters
Olympic athletes of Cyprus
Athletes (track and field) at the 1996 Summer Olympics
Commonwealth Games competitors for Cyprus
Athletes (track and field) at the 1994 Commonwealth Games
Athletes (track and field) at the 1998 Commonwealth Games
Athletes (track and field) at the 2002 Commonwealth Games
World Athletics Championships athletes for Cyprus
Athletes (track and field) at the 1993 Mediterranean Games
Athletes (track and field) at the 1997 Mediterranean Games
Athletes (track and field) at the 2001 Mediterranean Games
Mediterranean Games silver medalists for Cyprus
Mediterranean Games medalists in athletics
Olympic female sprinters